Leonard Pelham Lee (1903–1980) was an executive in the English internal combustion engine industry.

Biography
Leonard Pelham Lee was born as the son of Horace Pelham Lee on 31 May 1903.  He joined Coventry Climax Engines in 1919 and became a Director in 1927.

He married Ivy D. Jones in 1933, and had a son, Charles Pelham Lee.

In 1953, he was appointed Chairman and Managing Director of Coventry Climax Engines on the death of his father, who was the founder/owner.

He was appointed Chairman (formerly Joint MD) of Godiva Fire Pumps in 1957.

He lived at Park House, Warwick Road, Coventry, and was appointed the Chairman of British Internal Combustion Engine Manufacturers Association in 1960 at age 57.

He died in 1980 in Warwickshire, England.

Formula One
In 1961, Coventry Climax was dominating the British Formula One field with the successful FPF and FWMV engines, but FWMV's initial selling price (3,000 Pounds), though considerably higher than the selling price of FPF (2,250 Pounds), did not cover the development cost and the mounting maintenance cost as more and more teams wanted to run it.  He announced that the situation is the equivalent of his company subsidising the teams, so that the company will withdraw from Formula One racing at the end of the year.

As the customer teams did not have alternative engine suppliers, and thus being totally dependent on the supply of the FWMV engine, the teams got together and negotiated with Lee so that Oil company sponsorship funds would be funneled through the teams to Coventry Climax to cover the mounting costs, and Lee agreed to continue the development and support of these engines.

This incident became the seed for the formation of Formula One Constructors Association later in the 1970s.

Dewar Trophy
In May 1964, the Royal Automobile Club presented the Dewar Trophy, which is given at the recommendation of RAC's Technical and Engineering Committee for the most outstanding British achievement in the automotive field, to Leonard Pelham Lee.  The citation reads: "Awarded to Coventry Climax Engines Ltd. for the design, development and production of engines which have brought British cars to the forefront in the field of Grand Prix racing."

History of this trophy dates back to 1906.  The last time Dewar Trophy was awarded before 1964, the recipient was Alec Issigonis for British Motor Corporation in 1959, who once was a Junior Engineer at Coventry Climax, on the design and production of ADO15 Mini.

See also
Henry Pelham Lee
Coventry Climax Engines
Godiva Fire Pumps

References

1903 births
1980 deaths
20th-century English businesspeople